Chornobai Raion was a raion (district—administrative region) of eastern Cherkasy Oblast, in central Ukraine. Its administrative center was located in the urban-type settlement of Chornobai. The raion was abolished on 18 July 2020 as part of the administrative reform of Ukraine, which reduced the number of raions of Cherkasy Oblast to four. The area of Chornobai Raion was merged into Zolotonosha Raion. The last estimate of the raion population was 

At the time of disestablishment, the raion consisted of two hromadas, Chornobai settlement hromada with the administration in Chornobai and Irkliiv rural hromada with the administration in the selo of Irkliiv.

Geography 
Chornobay Raion covered an area of 1,554 km² — (600 sq mi).

References

Former raions of Cherkasy Oblast
1923 establishments in Ukraine
Ukrainian raions abolished during the 2020 administrative reform